The Sideways I ꟷ is an epigraphic variant of Latin capital letter I used in early medieval Celtic inscriptions from Wales and southwest England (Cornwall and Devon).  About 36 monumental inscriptions in Wales, and about 15 in Cornwall and Devon, mostly dating from the 5th-6th centuries, make use of this letter.  Except for a single inscription from the Isle of Man, it is not found in monumental inscriptions elsewhere.  The letter is used exclusively in a word-final position for Latin words (or Latinized Celtic names) in the second declension genitive singular.

Encoding
The character was proposed for encoding in the Unicode standard in 2011. It has since been encoded at code point  in Unicode 7.0.

References

Typography
Epigraphic letter variants
Sub-Roman Britain
Medieval Latin inscriptions
5th-century introductions